Víctor Manuelle is the eponymous third studio album by Puerto Rican salsero Víctor Manuelle. Released in 1996, Víctor Manuelle was the first successful album by the artist to chart including one single that reached in the top ten in the Hot Latin Tracks.

Background
Víctor Manuelle first started his recording career with the release of Justo a Tiempo... (Just in the Time...), which was produced by his protógé, Gilberto Santa Rosa. Despite this, the album did not the chart and the lead single Me Dará el Consentimiento (She Will Give the Consent) only peaked #21 on the Hot Latin Tracks. The follow-up album, Solo Contigo (Only with you), again did not chart on Billboard. However, the lead single Apiadate de Mi (Pity me) was more successful than the previous singles and reached #16 on the Hot Latin Tracks and #3 on the Latin Tropical Airplay chart. With the release of the eponymous album, the album was the first to chart in the Top Latin Albums and Tropical Albums chart. The lead single, Hay Que Poner el Alma also achieved the Top Ten on Hot Latin Tracks peaking at number-six.

Track listing
 Pensamiento y Palabra - 4:50
 Hay Que Poner el Alma - 5:06
 Ahora Me Toca a Mi - 6:06
 La Razón de Mi Vida - 5:05 
 Volverás - 5:27 
 Todo Quedó, Quedó - 5:06 
 Como Una Estrella - 4:49
 Sin Querer Queriendo - 5:29

Chart position

Album

Sales and certifications

References

1996 albums
Víctor Manuelle albums
Sony Discos albums
Albums produced by Sergio George